Forjães is a civil parish in the municipality of Esposende, Portugal. The population in 2011 was 2,767, in an area of 8.30 km².

References

Parishes of Esposende